The Global Earth Observation System of Systems (GEOSS) was built by the Group on Earth Observations (GEO) on the basis of a 10-Year Implementation Plan running from 2005 to 2015. GEOSS seeks to connect the producers of environmental data and decision-support tools with the end users of these products, with the aim of enhancing the relevance of Earth observations to global issues. GEOSS aims to produce a global public infrastructure that generates comprehensive, near-real-time environmental data, information and analyses for a wide range of users. The Secretariat Director of Geoss is Barbara Ryan.

Earth observation systems 
Earth observation systems consist of instruments and models designed to measure, monitor and predict the physical, chemical and biological aspects of the Earth system. Buoys floating in the oceans monitor temperature and salinity; meteorological stations and balloons record air quality and rainwater trends; sonar and radar systems estimate fish and bird populations; seismic and Global Positioning System (GPS) stations record movements in the Earth’s crust and interior; some 60-plus high-tech environmental satellites scan the planet from space; powerful computerized models generate simulations and forecasts; and early warning systems issue alerts to vulnerable populations.

These various systems have typically operated in isolation from one another. In recent years, however, sophisticated new technologies for gathering vast quantities of near-real-time and high-resolution Earth observation data have become operational. At the same time, improved forecasting models and decision-support tools are increasingly allowing decision makers and other users of Earth observations to fully exploit this widening stream of information.

With investments in Earth observations now reaching a critical mass, it has become possible to link diverse observing systems together to paint a full picture of the Earth’s condition. Because the costs and logistics of expanding Earth observations are daunting for any single nation, linking systems together through international cooperation also offers cost savings.

Implementation
As a networked system, GEOSS is owned by all of the GEO Members and Participating Organizations. Partners maintain full control of the components and activities that they contribute to the system of systems. Implementation is being pursued through a Work Plan consisting of over 70 tasks. Each task supports one of the nine societal-benefit or four transverse areas and is carried out by interested Members and Participating Organizations. Governments and organizations have also advanced GEOSS by contributing a variety of “Early Achievements”; these “First 100 Steps to GEOSS” were presented to the 2007 Cape Town Ministerial Summit.

Interlinking observation systems requires common standards for architecture and data sharing. The architecture of an Earth observation system refers to the way in which its components are designed so that they function as a whole. Each GEOSS component must be included in the GEOSS registry and configured so that it can communicate with the other participating systems. In addition, each contributor to GEOSS must subscribe to the GEO data-sharing principles, which aim to ensure the full and open exchange of data, metadata and products. These issues are fundamental to the successful operation of GEOSS.

GEOSS will disseminate information and analyses directly to users. GEO is developing the GEOPortal as a single Internet gateway to the data produced by GEOSS. The purpose of GEOPortal is to make it easier to integrate diverse data sets, identify relevant data and portals of contributing systems, and access models and other decision-support tools. For users without good access to high-speed internet, GEO has established GEONETCast, a system of four communications satellites that transmit data to low-cost receiving stations maintained by the users.

At present, GEONETCast seems still in its infancy, yet some tools have already been worked out. The GEONETCast toolbox has been made available and contains tools to access some radar altimetry, vegetation, satellite prediction and maritime information. Other useful information available through GEONETCast is vegetation and desert locust information provided under the DevCoCast project, which is a subproject of GEONETCast.

User groups
The growing demand for Earth observation data and information is the driving force behind GEOSS. The GEOSS Implementation Plan identifies nine distinct groups of users and uses, which it calls “Societal Benefit Areas”. The nine areas are disasters, health, energy, climate, water, weather, ecosystems, agriculture and biodiversity. Current and potential users include decision makers in the public and private sectors, resource managers, planners, emergency responders and scientists.

Related initiatives 
GEOSS can be characterized as a contribution towards the establishment of a spatial data infrastructure. 
It is one of three related initiatives that are the subject of the GIGAS (GEOSS, INSPIRE and GMES an Action in Support) harmonization project under the auspices of the EU 7th Framework Programme.

Participating organizations

 AARSE: African Association of Remote Sensing of the Environment
 ACCREC: African Climate Change Research Centre
 ADIE: Association for the Development of Environmental Information
 ADPC: Asian Disaster Preparedness Center
 Afriterra Foundation
 APN: Asia-Pacific Network for Global Change Research
 CATHALAC: Water Center for the Humid Tropics of Latin America and the Caribbean
 CEOS: Committee on Earth Observation Satellites
 CEDARE: Centre for Environment and Development for the Arab Region and Europe
 CGMS: Coordination Group for Meteorological Satellites
 CMO: Caribbean Meteorological Organization
 COSPAR: Committee on Space Research
 DIVERSITAS
 EARSC: European Association of Remote Sensing Companies
 ECMWF: European Centre for Medium-Range Weather Forecasts
 EEA: European Environment Agency
 EIS-AFRICA: Environmental Information Systems - AFRICA
 EPI: Environment Pulse Institute
 ESA: European Space Agency
 ESEAS: European Sea Level Service
 EUMETNET: Network of European Meteorological Services - Composite Observing System
 EUMETSAT: European Organization for the Exploitation of Meteorological Satellites
 EuroGeoSurveys: Association of the Geological Surveys of the European Union
 FAO: Food and Agriculture Organization of the United Nations
 FDSN: International Federation of Digital Seismograph Networks
 GBIF: Global Biodiversity Information Facility
 GCOS: Global Climate Observing System
 GSDI: Global Spatial Data Infrastructure
 GOOS: Global Ocean Observing System
 GTOS: Global Terrestrial Observing System
 IAG: International Association of Geodesy
 ICSU: International Council for Science
 IEEE: Institute of Electrical and Electronics Engineers
 IGBP: International Geosphere-Biosphere Program
 IGFA: International Group of Funding Agencies for Global Change Research
 IHE Delft Institute for Water Education
 IHO: International Hydrographic Organization
 IISL: International Institute for Space Law
 ILTER: International Long Term Ecological Research Network
 INCOSE: International Council on Systems Engineering
 IO3C: International Ozone Commission
 IOC: Intergovernmental Oceanographic Commission
 ISCGM: International Steering Committee for Global Mapping
 ISDR: International Strategy for Disaster Reduction
 ISPRS: International Society for Photogrammetry and Remote Sensing
 OGC: Open Geospatial Consortium
 POGO: Partnership for Observation of the Global Ocean
 Radiant Earth
 RFF: Resources for the Future
 SICA/CCAD: Central American Commission for the Environment and Development
 SOPAC: South Pacific Applied Geoscience Commission
 UNCBD: United Nations Convention on Biodiversity
 UNEP: United Nations Environment Programme
 UNESCO: United Nations Educational, Scientific and Cultural Organization
 UNFCCC: United Nations Framework Convention on Climate Change
 UNITAR: United Nations Institute for Training and Research
 UNOOSA: United Nations Office for Outer Space Affairs
 UNU-EHS: United Nations University - Institute for Environment and Human Security
 WCRP: World Climate Research Programme
 WFPHA: World Federation of Public Health Associations
 WMO: World Meteorological Organization

Societal Benefit Areas

Societal Benefit Areas (SBAs) are eight environmental fields of interest, all of which relate to climate, around which the GEOSS project is exerting its efforts.  These include the categories and subcategories below.

A preliminary hierarchical vocabulary has been created.  Currently, the hierarchical vocabulary structuring these societal benefit categories and their subcategories are available only in English.  However, translations have been created for French, Spanish and Italian versions by Claudia Cialone and Kristin Stock of the Centre for Geospatial Science (CGS) at the University of Nottingham, UK, with input from a number of people from the Consiglio Nazionale delle Ricerche (CNR) in Italy, the University of Zaragoza and the European Union Joint Research Centre (JRC). Translations have also been accomplished for a Slovenian version of the SBAs by the Biotehnical faculty of the University of Ljubljana, SI.

Disaster Resilience

This SBA is meant to increase the system of the earth observation to protect human lives from natural hazards such as tsunami, sea and lake ice, floods, volcanic eruptions, wild fires etc.

Public Health Surveillance

The health SBA is meant to understand and to prevent the environmental factors related to human diseases.  Some subcategories included in this concern infectious diseases, respiratory problems, environmental stress, accidental death and injury and so forth.

Energy and mineral resource management

This SBA is concerned with the preservation and the operations related to energetic sources, and their renewability.  Some examples of subcategories for this field are: oil & gas exploration, refining and transport operations, renewable energy operations, global energy management etc..

Water resources management

The water topic is inherent to hydrological research, evaluation and management and the impact of humans on the water cycle.  The area includes subfields of interest such as global biogeochemistry, fisheries and habitat, telecommunication and navigation, predictions etc.

Infrastructure and transport

This category provides information for Earth observations support for planning, monitoring and management of infrastructure (dams, roads, rail, ports and pipelines) and transportation (air, land and sea).

Food security and sustainable agriculture

This field of concern embraces all those agricultural activities, or related subjects such as grazing systems, the economic trade of agricultural products, for monitoring the global condition of food including the prevention of desertification.

Biodiversity and ecosystem sustainability

This area is meant to disseminate information related to the investigation on the genetic diversity of species and more generally on the natural resources of the different ecosystems and the services available for their conservation.

References

 Chuvieco, Emilio (2008) Earth Observation of Global Change: The Role of Satellite Remote Sensing in Monitoring the Global Environment Springer  page 10
 Luzeaux, Dominique; Ruaul, Jean-René (eds) (2013) Systems of Systems John Wiley & Sons  pg 215-218

External links
 official website

 List of web sites of GEO Participating Organizations
 GEOSS Best Practices Wiki, Entries by the GMES Network of Users
 Canadian Group on Earth Observations
 German GEO
 Austrian GEO
 European Commission
 Europe GMES 
 CATHALAC
 The Netherlands and GEO
 US GEO
 US NOAA
 US EPA
 The GIGAS Forum
 South African Environmental Observation Network

Earth observation projects

International geographic data and information organizations
Climate change and the environment
2000s in the environment
2010s in the environment